The Canisius Golden Griffins baseball team is a varsity intercollegiate athletic team of Canisius College in Buffalo, New York, United States. The team is a member of the Metro Atlantic Athletic Conference, which is part of the National Collegiate Athletic Association's Division I. The team plays home games at the Demske Sports Complex in Buffalo, New York. The Golden Griffins are coached by Matt Mazurek.

Year-by-year results
Below is a table of the program's yearly records.

Major League Baseball
Canisius has had 15 Major League Baseball Draft selections since the draft began in 1965.

See also
List of NCAA Division I baseball programs

References

External links
 

 
Baseball teams established in 1954
1954 establishments in New York (state)